The feather-barbelled squeaker (Synodontis manni) is a species of upside-down catfish endemic to Kenya where it is found in the lower Tana River.  This species grows to a length of  SL.

References

External links 

Synodontis
Endemic freshwater fish of Kenya
Fish described in 2001
Taxonomy articles created by Polbot